Hillfield, Hill Field, or, variation, may refer to:

Places
 Hillfield, Devon, England, a location
 Hillfield, Solihull, West Midlands, England, a location
 Hillfields, Coventry, West Midlands, England, UK
 Hillfields, Bristol, England, UK
 Hillfield Gardens, Gloucester, England, UK
 Hillfield Park, Solihull, West Midlands, England, UK
 Hill Field Road (SR 232) Utah, USA

Facilities and structures
 Hillfield Court, Belsize Park, Camden, London, England, UK; a residential complex
 Hillfield House, Gloucester, England, UK; a listed building
 Hill Field (IATA airport code: HIF, ICAO airport code: KHIF), Ogden, Utah, USA; a U.S. Airforce Base
 Talmadge L. Hill Field House, Baltimore, Maryland, USA; a multipurpose arena

Other uses
 Hill-Fields Entertainment, a U.S. production company

See also

 Hilly Flanks, Fertile Crescent
 Hillyfields (disambiguation)
 
 
 
 
 Hilly (disambiguation)
 Hill (disambiguation)
 Field (disambiguation)
 Fields (disambiguation)